Grøntjernkollen  is a mountain located on the border between Hof municipality in Vestfold and Kongsberg municipality in Buskerud, Norway.

References

Mountains of Viken
Mountains of Vestland